Woodson Taylor Slater (November 18, 1858 – November 30, 1928) was an American attorney and jurist in Oregon. He was the 38th associate justice of the Oregon Supreme Court, serving from 1909 to 1911. Slater was the son of Congressman James H. Slater. The Oregon native also worked in the state’s treasurer’s office and for the Supreme Court prior to his appointment as a judge to the state’s highest court.

Early life
Woodson Slater was born on November 18, 1858, in Corvallis, Benton County, Oregon Territory to Elizabeth (Edna) Gray and later Congressman James H. Slater.  In 1863 the family moved to Walla Walla, Washington, and then Auburn, Oregon, before settling in the Eastern Oregon town of La Grande in 1866. There in Union County Woodson received his primary education in the public schools. In 1883, he graduated from the University of Oregon in Eugene, Oregon before being admitted to the bar two years later. Slater married in 1885 to Mary Price Howe and the couple would have four children.

Legal career
Upon becoming a lawyer Slater moved to Pendleton, Oregon, and began practicing law in 1886. The following year he moved to Salem, Oregon, where he worked in the office of the Oregon State Treasurer until 1890. He then returned to La Grande where he became involved in the mercantile industry, but returned to Salem in 1894 and opened a law practice. In Salem, he taught law at Willamette University College of Law in 1903 as a professor of torts and contracts. Then from 1907 until early 1909 he was the commissioner of the Oregon Supreme Court. On February 12, 1909, Oregon Governor George Earle Chamberlain appointed Slater to the state supreme court bench when the court expanded from three to five justices.  He left the court at the end of the term on January 1, 1911.

Later years
Woodson T. Slater died in Portland, Oregon, on November 30, 1928 at the age of 70.

References

Justices of the Oregon Supreme Court
University of Oregon alumni
1858 births
1928 deaths
Willamette University College of Law faculty
People from La Grande, Oregon